John William White (1 August 1877–1958) was an English footballer who played in the Football League for Nottingham Forest.

References

1877 births
1958 deaths
English footballers
Association football defenders
English Football League players
Nottingham Forest F.C. players
Gillingham F.C. players